Stoke Hall is a Grade II listed  mansion, near the village of East Stoke in Nottinghamshire, England. It is located near the River Trent.

The red-brick house was built in 1812 for the Bromley baronets by Lewis Wyatt, who included parts of an earlier building. It was part demolished in the 1920s. It was Grade II listed on 16 January 1967.

The house is registered as a venue for weddings. The church of St Oswald is adjacent.

References

External links 

 Stoke Hall Weddings

Grade II listed buildings in Nottinghamshire